A Treatise on the Law of the Prerogatives of the Crown (full title: A Treatise on the Law of the Prerogatives of the Crown; and the Relative Duties and Rights of the Subject) is an 1820 legal text by Joseph Chitty. The text provides the most comprehensive list of royal prerogative powers in the United Kingdom.

References

External links
https://archive.org/details/atreatiseonlawp00chitgoog

Law of the United Kingdom
1820 non-fiction books
Constitutional laws of the United Kingdom
1820 in British law
Royal prerogative
Treatises